A shrub (often also called a bush) is a small-to-medium-sized perennial woody plant. Unlike herbaceous plants, shrubs have persistent woody stems above the ground. Shrubs can be either deciduous or evergreen. Small shrubs, less than 2 m (6.6 ft) tall are sometimes termed as subshrubs. Many botanical groups have species that are shrubs, and others that are trees and herbaceous plants instead.

Others use  as the cut-off point for classification. Many species of tree may not reach this mature height because of hostile less than ideal growing conditions, and resemble a shrub-sized plant. However, such species have the potential to grow taller under the ideal growing conditions for that plant. In terms of longevity, most shrubs fit in a class between perennials and trees; some may only last about five years even in good conditions, others, usually the larger and more woody ones, may live to 70 or more, but on average they last 7–10 years.

Shrubland is the natural landscape dominated by various shrubs; there are many distinct types around the world, including fynbos, maquis, shrub-steppe, shrub swamp and moorland. In gardens and parks, an area largely dedicated to shrubs (now somewhat less fashionable than a century ago) is called a shrubbery, shrub border or shrub garden. There are many garden cultivars of shrubs, bred for flowering, for example rhododendrons, and sometimes even leaf colour or shape.

Compared to trees and herbaceous plants, perhaps a relatively small number of shrubs have agricultural or commercial uses. Apart from the several berry-bearing species (using the culinary rather than botanical definition), few are eaten directly, and they are generally too small for much timber use unlike trees. Those that are used include several perfumed species such as lavender and rose, and a wide range of plants with medicinal uses. Tea and coffee are on the tree-shrub boundary; they are normally harvested from shrub-sized plants, but these would be large enough to become small trees if left to grow instead.

Definition
Shrubs are perennial woody plants, and therefore have persistent woody stems above ground (compare with succulent stems of herbaceous plants). Usually, shrubs are distinguished from trees by their height and multiple stems. Some shrubs are deciduous (e.g. hawthorn) and others evergreen (e.g. holly). Ancient Greek philosopher Theophrastus divided the plant world into trees, shrubs and herbs.

Most definitions characterize shrubs as possessing multiple stems with no main trunk below.  This is because the stems have branched below ground level. There are exceptions to this, with some shrubs having main trunks, but these tend to be very short and divide into multiple stems close to ground level without a reasonable length beforehand. Many trees can grow in multiple stemmed forms also while being tall enough to be trees, such as oak or ash.

Use in gardens and parks
 
An area of cultivated shrubs in a park or a garden is known as a shrubbery. When clipped as topiary, suitable species or varieties of shrubs develop dense foliage and many small leafy branches growing close together. Many shrubs respond well to renewal pruning, in which hard cutting back to a "stool", removes everything but vital parts of the plant, resulting in long new stems known as "canes". Other shrubs respond better to selective pruning to dead or unhealthy, or otherwise unattractive parts to reveal their structure and character.

Shrubs in common garden practice are generally considered broad-leaved plants, though some smaller conifers such as mountain pine and common juniper are also shrubby in structure. Species that grow into a shrubby habit may be either deciduous or evergreen.

Botanical structure 

For example, a descriptive system widely adopted in Australia is based on structural characteristics based on life-form, plus the height and amount of foliage cover of the tallest layer or dominant species.

 dense foliage cover (70–100%) — closed-shrubs
 mid-dense foliage cover (30–70%) — open-shrubs
 sparse foliage cover (10–30%) — tall shrubland
 very sparse foliage cover (<10%) — tall open shrubland

 dense foliage cover (70–100%) — closed-heath or closed low shrubland—(North America)
 mid-dense foliage cover (30–70%) — open-heath or mid-dense low shrubland—(North America)
 sparse foliage cover (10–30%) — low shrubland
 very sparse foliage cover (<10%) — low open shrubland

List of shrubs 
Those marked with * can also develop into tree form if in ideal conditions.

A
 Abelia (Abelia)
 Acer (Maple) *
 Actinidia (Actinidia)
 Aloe (Aloe)
 Aralia (Angelica Tree, Hercules' Club) *
 Arctostaphylos (Bearberry, Manzanita) *
 Aronia (Chokeberry)
 Artemisia (Sagebrush)
 Aucuba (Aucuba)
B
 Berberis (Barberry)
 Bougainvillea (Bougainvillea)
 Brugmansia (Angel's trumpet)
 Buddleja (Butterfly bush)
 Buxus (Box) *
C
 Calia (Mescalbean)
 Callicarpa (Beautyberry) *
 Callistemon (Bottlebrush) *
 Calluna (Heather)
 Calycanthus (Sweetshrub)
 Camellia (Camellia, Tea) *
 Caragana (Pea-tree) *
 Carpenteria (Carpenteria)
 Caryopteris (Blue Spiraea)
 Cassiope (Moss-heather)
 Ceanothus (Ceanothus) *
 Celastrus (Staff vine) *
 Ceratostigma (Hardy Plumbago)
 Cercocarpus (Mountain-mahogany) *
 Chaenomeles (Japanese Quince)
 Chamaebatiaria (Fernbush)
 Chamaedaphne (Leatherleaf)
 Chimonanthus (Wintersweet)
 Chionanthus (Fringe-tree) *
 Choisya (Mexican-orange Blossom) *
 Cistus (Rockrose)
 Clerodendrum (Clerodendrum)
 Clethra (Summersweet, Pepperbush) *
 Clianthus (Glory Pea)
 Colletia (Colletia)
 Colutea (Bladder Senna)
 Comptonia (Sweetfern)
 Cornus (Dogwood) *
 Corylopsis (Winter-hazel) *
 Cotinus (Smoketree) *
 Cotoneaster (Cotoneaster) *
 Cowania (Cliffrose)
 Crataegus (Hawthorn) *
 Crinodendron (Crinodendron) *
 Cytisus and allied genera (Broom) *
D
 Daboecia (Heath)
 Danae (Alexandrian laurel)
 Daphne (Daphne)
 Decaisnea (Decaisnea)
 Dasiphora (Shrubby Cinquefoil)
 Dendromecon (Tree poppy)
 Desfontainea (Desfontainea)
 Deutzia (Deutzia)
 Diervilla (Bush honeysuckle)
 Dipelta (Dipelta)
 Dirca (Leatherwood)
 Dracaena (Dragon tree) *
 Drimys (Winter's Bark) *
 Dryas (Mountain Avens)
E
 Edgeworthia (Paper Bush) *
 Elaeagnus (Elaeagnus) *
 Embothrium (Chilean Firebush) *
 Empetrum (Crowberry)
 Enkianthus (Pagoda Bush)
 Ephedra (Ephedra)
 Epigaea (Trailing Arbutus)
 Erica (Heath)
 Eriobotrya (Loquat) *
 Escallonia (Escallonia)
 Eucryphia (Eucryphia) *
 Euonymus (Spindle) *
 Exochorda (Pearl Bush)
F
 Fabiana (Fabiana)
 Fallugia (Apache Plume)
 Fatsia (Fatsia)
 Forsythia (Forsythia)
 Fothergilla (Fothergilla)
 Franklinia (Franklinia) *
 Fremontodendron (Flannelbush)
 Fuchsia (Fuchsia) *
G
 Garrya (Silk-tassel) *
 Gaultheria (Salal)
 Gaylussacia (Huckleberry)
 Genista (Broom) *
 Gordonia (Loblolly-bay) *
 Grevillea (Grevillea)
 Griselinia (Griselinia) *
H
 Hakea (Hakea) *
 Halesia (Silverbell) *
 Halimium (Rockrose)
 Hamamelis (Witch-hazel) *
 Hebe (Hebe)
 Hedera (Ivy)
 Helianthemum (Rockrose)
 Hibiscus (Hibiscus) *
 Hippophae (Sea-buckthorn) *
 Hoheria (Lacebark) *
 Holodiscus (Creambush)
 Hudsonia (Hudsonia)
 Hydrangea (Hydrangea)
 Hypericum (Rose of Sharon)
 Hyssopus (Hyssop)
I
 Ilex (Holly) *
 Illicium (Star Anise) *
 Indigofera (Indigo)
 Itea (Sweetspire)
J
 Jamesia (Cliffbush)
 Jasminum (Jasmine)
 Juniperus (Juniper) *
K
 Kalmia (Mountain-laurel)
 Kerria (Kerria)
 Kolkwitzia (Beauty-bush)
L
 Lagerstroemia (Crape-myrtle) *
 Lapageria (Copihue)
 Lantana (Lantana)
 Lavandula (Lavender)
 Lavatera (Tree Mallow)
 Ledum (Ledum)
 Leitneria (Corkwood) *
 Lespedeza (Bush Clover) *
 Leptospermum (Manuka) *
 Leucothoe (Doghobble)
 Leycesteria (Leycesteria)
 Ligustrum (Privet) *
 Lindera (Spicebush) *
 Linnaea (Twinflower)
 Lonicera (Honeysuckle)
 Lupinus (Tree Lupin)
 Lycium (Boxthorn)
M
 Magnolia (Magnolia)
 Mahonia (Mahonia)
 Malpighia (Acerola)
 Menispermum (Moonseed)
 Menziesia (Menziesia)
 Mespilus (Medlar) *
 Microcachrys (Microcachrys)
 Myrica (Bayberry) *
 Myricaria (Myricaria)
 Myrtus and allied genera (Myrtle) *
N
 Neillia (Neillia)
 Nerium (Oleander)
O
 Olearia (Daisy bush) *
 Osmanthus (Osmanthus)
P
 Pachysandra (Pachysandra)
 Paeonia (Tree-peony)
 Persoonia (Geebungs)
 Philadelphus (Mock orange) *
 Phlomis (Jerusalem Sage)
 Photinia (Photinia) *
 Physocarpus (Ninebark) *
 Pieris (Pieris)
 Pistacia (Pistachio, Mastic) *
 Pittosporum (Pittosporum) *
 Plumbago (Leadwort)
 Polygala (Milkwort)
 Poncirus *
 Prunus (Cherry) *
 Purshia (Antelope Bush)
 Pyracantha (Firethorn)
Q
 Quassia (Quassia) *
 Quercus (Oak) *
 Quillaja (Quillay)
 Quintinia (Tawheowheo) *
R
 Rhamnus (Buckthorn) *
 Rhododendron (Rhododendron, Azalea) *
 Rhus (Sumac) *
 Ribes (Currant, Gooseberry)
 Romneya (Tree poppy)
 Rosa (Rose)
 Rosmarinus (Rosemary)
 Rubus (Bramble, Raspberry, Salmonberry, Wineberry)
 Ruta (Rue)
S
 Sabia *
 Salix (Willow) *
 Salvia (Sage)
 Salvia subg. [[Salvia subg. Perovskia|Perovskia]] (Russian Sage)
 Sambucus (Elder) *
 Santolina (Lavender Cotton)
 Sapindus (Soapberry) *
 Senecio (Senecio)
 Simmondsia (Jojoba)
 Skimmia (Skimmia)
 Smilax (Smilax)
 Sophora (Kowhai) *
 Sorbaria (Sorbaria)
 Spartium (Spanish Broom)
 Spiraea (Spiraea) *
 Staphylea (Bladdernut) *
 Stephanandra (Stephanandra)
 Styrax *
 Symphoricarpos (Snowberry)
 Syringa (Lilac) *
T
 Tamarix (Tamarix) *
 Taxus (Yew) *
 Telopea (Waratah) *
 Thuja cvs. (Arborvitae) *
 Thymelaea Thymus (Thyme)
 Trochodendron *
U
 Ulex (Gorse)
 Ulmus pumila celer (Turkestan elm – Wonder Hedge)
 Ungnadia (Mexican Buckeye)
V
 Vaccinium (Bilberry, Blueberry, Cranberry)
 Verbesina centroboyacana Verbena (Vervain)
 Viburnum (Viburnum) *
 Vinca (Periwinkle)
 Viscum (Mistletoe)
W
 Weigela (Weigela)
X
 Xanthoceras Xanthorhiza (Yellowroot)
 XylosmaY
 Yucca (Yucca, Joshua tree) *
Z
 Zanthoxylum *
 Zauschneria Zenobia Ziziphus'' *

References 

Plants
Plant morphology
 
Lists of plants
Plant life-forms
Plants by habit